Alison Howie (born 3 July 1991) is a Scottish female field hockey player who plays as a midfielder for the Scotland women's national field hockey team. She has represented Scotland in few international competitions including the 2013 Women's EuroHockey Nations Championship, 2015 Women's EuroHockey Nations Championship, 2017 Women's EuroHockey Nations Championship, and 2018 Commonwealth Games.

References 

1991 births
Living people
Scottish female field hockey players
Female field hockey midfielders
Field hockey players at the 2018 Commonwealth Games
Commonwealth Games competitors for Scotland
Field hockey players from Glasgow